Korean Brazilians (Korean: 한국계 브라질인 or 韓國系 브라질人) are Brazilians of full, partial or predominantly Korean ancestry or a Korean-born person residing in Brazil. The Korean population in Brazil, the largest in Latin America, is about 50,000.

On 6 January 2010, per Municipal Law nº 15100, the São Paulo City Council officially recognised Bom Retiro as the Korean cultural neighbourhood.

In terms of religion, the vast majority of Korean Brazilians are Protestant, with a minority of Catholics. There are more Korean churches than Korean restaurants in the Korean Brazilian community. There are also three Buddhist temples located in Korean communities in Brazil, which also attract non-Korean worshippers.

History
There were cases of Koreans immigrating to Brazil during the Japanese occupation of Korea such as Kim Soo Jo. In 1961, the Korean-Brazilian association made a deal to take Korean immigrants and the Korean-Brazilian cultural diplomatic group surveyed possible locations that would fit the Koreans. Official  agricultural immigration from South Korea to Brazil began in 1962, and the early Korean people who immigrated to Brazil were helped by anti-communist political prisoners. Korean immigrants soon abandoned their agricultural projects and moved to São Paulo, mainly to Bom Retiro, which was originally a Jewish area but became one of the centres of Korean residents. Most of the Korean residents began to work in the clothing industry.
In 1976, the South Korean government built the "Cross saemaul farm" near Brasília to solve the illegal Korean immigrants problem in Brazil. The Korean community was influenced by the 1994 economic policy Plano Real.

Culture

Newspapers
Before 1985, daily newspapers existed such as the Hankook Daily or Chosun Daily, but these early newspapers ended up being a republishing of already existing Korean articles from South Korea.
In 1985, the first Korean tabloid magazine "Newsbrazil" (published until 2011) was founded by Kim Jong Nam. The magazine helped the Korean-Brazilians, who were often illiterate in Portuguese, understand 
local economic policies ands ads were placed. It also played as a role as a communication space.

Education
Colégio Polilogos (브라질한국학교), a South Korean international school, was located in Bom Retiro, São Paulo.

Notable persons
 Angela Park, LPGA golfer (South Korean parents)
 Francisco Hyun-sol Kim, professional footballer (South Korean parents)
 Chyung Eun-ju, beauty pageant titleholder, model, student and TV presenter (Originally from Seoul, South Korea)
 Catharina Choi Nunes, Miss Korea 2013 second runner-up, Miss Earth Fire 2013, Miss World Brazil 2015 (Korean Brazilian mother)
 Iara Lee, filmmaker (Korean descent)
 Jung Mo Sung, liberation theologian (Originally from Seoul, South Korea)
 Kim Yun-sik, South Korean hapkido and taekwondo grandmaster, founder of Bum Moo Kwan Hapkido (Originally from Seoul, South Korea)
 Yoo Na Kim, journalist, writer (Originally from Seoul, South Korea)
 Pyong Lee, YouTuber, illusionist, hypnologist (South Korean father)

See also

 Brazil–North Korea relations
 Brazil–South Korea relations
 Immigration to Brazil
 Asian Brazilians
 Koreans
 Chinese Brazilians
 Japanese Brazilians

References

 
Overseas Korean groups